is the third official single by Japanese child actress and singer Mana Ashida, released on May 16, 2012. This is Ashida's second solo work after Sutekina Nichiyōbi, used as both the opening and ending themes of the Sanrio and Studio Comet anime series Jewelpet Kira Deco! and used as a song to promote the movie Jewelpet the Movie: Sweets Dance Princess. The single reached the 17th position on the Oricon Weekly Singles Charts after its release.

Production
The single was announced on March 16, 2012, and a press conference was held on March 30, 2012 at the Imperial Hotel, Tokyo to promote the film Jewelpet the Movie: Sweets Dance Princess. Mana Ashida and the designer of Hello Kitty Yuko Yamaguchi appeared alongside the guest stars. The single was released in both CD Maxi and CD+DVD versions, which included the video for "Zutto Zutto Tomodachi".

Track listing

References

External links
 Universal Music 

2012 singles
Japanese children's songs
Anime songs
Universal Music Japan singles
Jewelpet
2012 songs
Japanese film songs
Songs written for animated films